Bacalao, Bacallao, or Terra do Bacalhau was a phantom island depicted on several early 16th century Portuguese maps and nautical charts. The name is a variation of bacalhau, meaning "cod" or "stockfish".

According to Gaspar Frutuoso in his work Saudades da Terra, written in the 1570s, the Portuguese navigator João Vaz Corte-Real in 1472 was granted lands in the Azores by the king of Portugal, because of his discovery of the Terras do Bacalhau. Historians do not consider the work of Frutuoso as very reliable, as it contains a great deal of misinformation.

Off the northeast tip of Newfoundland's Avalon Peninsula is an island named Bacalaos, its name attested at least since 1556.

See also
Brasil (mythical island)
Cape Cod
Pre-Columbian transoceanic contact theories
Sacred Cod of Massachusetts
Vinland

Notes

Bibliography

Pre-Columbian trans-oceanic contact
History of Newfoundland and Labrador by location
Phantom islands of the Atlantic